Paulina Peled (born 20 April 1950) is an Israeli former professional tennis player. She was known as Paulina Peisachov before marriage.

Biography
Born in Lithuania, Peled moved to Israel at the age of 16.

She competed at the 1969 Maccabiah Games for Israel in women's singles.

Peled studied in the United States in the early 1970s at Arizona State University, where she also played college tennis. 

Returning to Israel, she became the first Israeli woman to win Israel's International Tennis Championship for two decades when she claimed the title in 1974. 

At the 1974 Asian Games in Tehran, she won a gold medal for Israel in the mixed doubles and a silver medal in the singles.

Peled made the second round of Wimbledon on three occasions. This included 1974, when while in the country she won the Chichester Tennis Tournament with a final win over Sue Barker and she also won the Kent Championships that year. 

She joined the professional tour in 1975 and was a regular member of Israel's Federation Cup team for the remainder of the decade, appearing in a total of 14 ties.

References

External links
 
 
 

1950 births
Living people
Israeli female tennis players
Soviet emigrants to Israel
Lithuanian Jews
Israeli emigrants
Jewish tennis players
Jewish Israeli sportspeople
Maccabiah Games tennis players
Competitors at the 1969 Maccabiah Games
Maccabiah Games competitors for Israel
Arizona State Sun Devils women's tennis players
Asian Games gold medalists for Israel
Asian Games silver medalists for Israel
Asian Games medalists in tennis
Medalists at the 1974 Asian Games
Tennis players at the 1974 Asian Games